Borrichia is a genus of flowering plants in the family Asteraceae. It is named for Danish physician Ole Borch (1628–1690). Members of the genus are commonly known as seaside tansies. They are native to North and South America.

Species and nothospecies
Sources for species and nothospecies:
 Borrichia arborescens (L.) DC. – tree seaside tansy - Florida, West Indies, Belize, Honduras, Tabasco, Veracruz, Yucatán Peninsula
 Borrichia × cubana Britton & S.F.Blake – Cuban borrichia	 - Cuba, southern Florida
 Borrichia frutescens (L.) DC. – bushy seaoxeye, bushy seaside tansy - coastal regions from Yucatán Peninsula to Maryland; also Coahuila, San Luis Potosí
 Borrichia peruviana (Lam.) DC. - Peru

References

External links
 
 
 USDA PLANTS Profile

Heliantheae
Asteraceae genera
Taxa named by Michel Adanson